Norf station is a station in the city of Neuss in the German state of North Rhine-Westphalia. It is on the Lower Left Rhine Railway and it is classified by Deutsche Bahn as a category 5 station. The station is located between the Neuss districts of Norf and Derikum. It serves the southern suburbs of Neuss, including Gnadental, Erftal, Grimlinghausen and Üdesheim.

The station opened on 15 November 1855 of the Lower Left Rhine Railway. After the integration of the town of Norf into the city of Neuss, its name was retained and it not renamed Neuss-Norf, as would normally be expected in Germany. Since 1985, Norf station has been served by line S 11 of the Rhine-Ruhr S-Bahn.

The station is served by line S 11, running between Düsseldorf Airport and Bergisch Gladbach every 20 minutes during the day.

It is also served by bus route 827, operated by Rheinbahn at 20- to 60-minute intervals, and two bus routes operated by Stadtwerke Neuss, 841, running at 20- to 30-minute intervals and, 852, running at 30-minute intervals.

References

Footnotes

Sources

Rhine-Ruhr S-Bahn stations
S11 (Rhine-Ruhr S-Bahn)
Neuss
Buildings and structures in Rhein-Kreis Neuss
Railway stations in Germany opened in 1855